R1 was the first nuclear reactor of Sweden. It was a research reactor located at the KTH Royal Institute of Technology campus at Valhallavägen in central Stockholm, in the rock beneath the current-day Q buildings. The reactor was active from July 13, 1954 to June 6, 1970. The reactor was dismantled, and there is nothing left of it today; the reactor hall however still exists.

History 
As World War II came to a close, the Swedish government in 1950 formed a group of physicists and engineers to study and learn more about the basics – reactor physics, radiation, materials, etc. – but also to produce medical isotopes. The capacity of the reactor was originally 300 kW but was later increased to 1 MW. R1 was housed in a large hall reminiscent of a cathedral giving it the nickname the “Cathedral of Science and Technology”. Rolf Sievert served as the head of the radiation department at KTH Royal Institute of Technology and gave the approval to run the reactor. R1 was soon overtaken by Studsvik for nuclear research and on June 6, 1970 R1 was dismantled.

Today 
After being dismantled, the hall that R1 sat was deemed safe and was used for events like art exhibitions, concerts and music videos due to its interesting aesthetic and acoustics. It is open to the public during limited times for tours.

In 2016, the reactor hall was used to film the music video for Alan Walker's song Faded (Restrung). The video was released on 11 February 2016.

Images

References

Nuclear research reactors
KTH Royal Institute of Technology
Nuclear technology in Sweden
Nuclear weapons programme of Sweden
1954 in science
1954 establishments in Sweden
1970 disestablishments
History of Stockholm
Defunct nuclear reactors